Troy Dusosky (born May 12, 1976 in Anoka, Minnesota) is a retired American soccer defender who played for the Milwaukee Wave of the Major Indoor Soccer League.  Over his career, he has played primarily indoor soccer with a handful of seasons in the USL A-League.  He also briefly worked as a professional wrestler.

Soccer
Dusosky graduated from Anoka High School in 1994.  After spending one year attending Viterbo College in La Crosse, Wisconsin, he turned professional.  In 1995, he signed a developmental contract with Cleveland Crunch of the National Professional Soccer League.  However, he still saw time in 20 first team games as the Crunch won the league championship.  Dusosky and his team mates repeated as champions in 1999.  In September 2001, the Crunch traded Dusosky to the Milwaukee Wave in exchange for Jim Larkin.   He lost over half the 2004-2005 season after tearing his anterior cruciate ligament.  While he played twenty-five games in the 2005-2006 season, he was forced to have surgery and did not return to playing until December 2006.

During his indoor career, Dusosky would also occasionally play indoor or outdoor soccer during the summer season.   In 1998, he played for the Lafayette SwampCats of the Eastern Indoor Soccer League.  The Swamp Cats won the league title.   In 1999, he played for the Cincinnati Riverhawks in USL A-League.  In 2003, he signed with the Milwaukee Wave United an USL A-League affiliate of the Milwaukee Wave.  United played two seasons before folding.

Dusosky retired in December 2011.  At the time of his retirement, he was tenth on the list of career Wave games played (257), ninth in assists (92), seventh in 3-point goals (16), sixth in blocks (320) and first in penalty minutes (185).  He was All Pro in 2001-02, 2002–03 and 2008-09.  He was also an All Star in 2002, 2003, 2004 and 2006.  During his ten years with the Wave, the team won three championships.

Futsal
Dusosky played for the United States national futsal team at the 2007 Pan American Games.  He scored two goals as the U.S. finished fifth.

Professional wrestling
In addition to his soccer career, Dusosky and his twin brother Todd were a professional wrestlers known as The Super Ds in the NWF Kids Pro Wrestling’s lightweight division.  The brothers were the promotion's first Lightweight Tag Team Champions when the title was introduced on April 15, 1985. They held the belts for over a month before dropping them to the team of Rough Ryan and Mean Dean on May 25. On February 15 the following year, they regained the title by defeating Rough Ryan and Invader I. On May 9, they lost the title belts to The Rough Russians but won them back in a rematch on July 26. Their final reign ended when their mother refused to allow them to compete due to an upcoming soccer tournament. They were stripped of the championship on October 18, 1986, and the belts were awarded to The Blade Runners by forfeit. They were scheduled for a title shot inside a steel cage against The Blade Runners in February 1987 as part of the NWF's "Star Cage '87" but the event was scrapped in early January of that year.

Championships and accomplishments
National Wrestling Federation: Kids Pro Wrestling
NWF:KPW Lightweight Tag Team Championship (3 times) - with Todd Dusosky

References

External links
 Cleveland Crunch Player Profile
 Milwaukee Wave Player Profile

1976 births
Living people
American Professional Soccer League players
American men's futsal players
American male professional wrestlers
American soccer players
Cincinnati Riverhawks players
Cleveland Crunch players
Eastern Indoor Soccer League players
Futsal players at the 2007 Pan American Games
Milwaukee Wave players
Milwaukee Wave United players
National Professional Soccer League (1984–2001) players
Viterbo University alumni
People from Anoka, Minnesota
Pan American Games competitors for the United States
Association football defenders
Anoka High School alumni